Iban Iriondo Uranga (born May 1, 1984 in Zumaia, Basque Country) is a Spanish former professional road bicycle racer, who rode professionally in 2006 and 2007 for the  team.

External links 
Profile at Euskaltel-Euskadi official website 

Cyclists from the Basque Country (autonomous community)
Spanish male cyclists
1984 births
Living people
People from Urola Kosta
Sportspeople from Gipuzkoa